Broadleaf may refer to:

 Broad-leaved tree
Broadleaf forest
 In agronomy, a term described in contrast to Poaceae. That is to say that broadleaf plants are not grasses:
 Broadleaf weed
 Broadleaf crop
 A member of Magnoliopsida, informal term

See also
 Corymbia confertiflora, also known as the broad leaf carbeen
 Eucalyptus dives, also known as the broad-leaf peppermint
 Rubus moluccanus, also known as the broad-leaf bramble
 Dodonaea viscosa, also known as the broad leaf hopbush
 Ligustrum lucidum, also known as the broad-leaf privet
 Eucalyptus camphora, also known as the broad-leaf sallee
 Lysimachia pendens, also known as the broad-leaf yellow loosestrife
 Allium victorialis, also known as the Alpine broad-leaf allium